In ancient Roman religion, the Di Penates or Penates were among the dii familiares, or household deities, invoked most often in domestic rituals. When the family had a meal, they threw a bit into the fire on the hearth for the Penates. They were thus associated with Vesta, the Lares, and the Genius of the pater familias in the "little universe" of the domus.

Like other domestic deities, the Penates had a public counterpart.

Function
An etymological interpretation of the Penates would make them in origin tutelary deities of the storeroom, Latin penus, the innermost part of the house, where they guarded the household's food, wine, oil, and other supplies. As they were originally associated with the source of food, they eventually became a symbol of the continuing life of the family. Cicero explained that they "dwell inside, from which they are also called penetrales by the poets". The 2nd-century AD grammarian Festus defined penus, however, as "the most secret site in the shrine of Vesta, which is surrounded by curtains." Macrobius reports the theological view of Varro that "those who dig out truth more diligently have said that the Penates are those through whom we breathe in our inner core (penitus), through whom we have a body, through whom we possess a rational mind."

Public Penates
The Penates of Rome (Penates Publici Populi Romani) had a temple on the Velia near the Palatine. Dionysius of Halicarnassus says it housed statues of two youths in the archaic style.

The public cult of the ancestral gods of the Roman people originated in Lavinium, where they were also closely linked with Vesta. One tradition identified the public Penates as the sacred objects rescued by Aeneas from Troy and carried by him to Italy. They, or perhaps rival duplicates, were eventually housed in the Temple of Vesta in the Forum. Thus, the Penates, unlike the localized Lares, are portable deities.

Archaeological evidence from Lavinium shows marked Greek influence in the archaic period, and Aeneas was venerated there as Father Indiges. At the new year, Roman magistrates first sacrificed to Capitoline Jupiter at Rome, and then traveled to Lavinium for sacrifices to Jupiter Indiges and Vesta, and a ceremonial visit to the "Trojan" Penates.

See also
Penny Penates

References

Tutelary deities
Ancient Roman religion
Roman deities
Deities in the Aeneid
Household deities